The blue whale is the largest species of whale, and the largest species of animal known to have existed.

Blue whale may also refer to:

 Blue Whale Harbour, an anchorage on South Georgia Island
 Blue Whale Mountain, a mountain on South Georgia Island
 Blue Whale Systems, a British mobile phone services software company
 Blue Whale of Catoosa a waterfront structure, just east of Catoosa, Oklahoma
 Blue Whale Jazz Club, a jazz club in Los Angeles
 Blue Whale Challenge, an online game that reportedly features suicide as the end goal
 Blue Whale 1, a rocket developed by Perigee Aerospace
 A short-lived band featuring drummer Aynsley Dunbar
 Nickname of Center Blue, a large building within the Pacific Design Center